The 2016–17 FC Rot-Weiß Erfurt season is the 51st season in the football club's history. For the 9th consecutive season, Rot-Weiß Erfurt play in the 3. Liga. They also are participating in this season's edition of the Thuringian Cup. The season covers a period from 1 July 2016 to 30 June 2017.

Players

Squad

Competitions

3. Liga

League table

Results summary

Results by round

Matches

Thuringian Cup

References

FC Rot-Weiß Erfurt seasons
Rot-Weiß Erfurt, FC